Bantoanon may refer to:

Bantoanon language, also called Asi, a regional Visayan language spoken in Romblon Province, Philippines

See also
Ban Tanong, a village in Attopu Province, Laos
Banton, Romblon, a municipality in Romblon Province, Philippines